Podjelje is a high-elevation settlement in the Municipality of Bohinj in the Upper Carniola region of Slovenia.

Name
The name Podjelje is a fused prepositional phrase (pod 'below' + Jelje) that has lost case inflection. The name refers to the location of the village below the Jelje mountain pasture, which is located in neighboring Goreljek.

References

External links

Podjelje at Geopedia

Populated places in the Municipality of Bohinj